Scott Sanderson (born June 15, 1962) is the former head men's basketball coach at Lipscomb University. He resigned from his position after 14 years on April 9, 2013.  Sanderson is the son of former University of Alabama head coach Wimp Sanderson.

References

1962 births
Living people
American men's basketball coaches
American men's basketball players
Colorado Buffaloes men's basketball coaches
Lipscomb Bisons men's basketball coaches
New Orleans Privateers men's basketball coaches
Place of birth missing (living people)
South Carolina Gamecocks men's basketball coaches
South Carolina Gamecocks men's basketball players
Mobile Rams men's basketball coaches
Virginia Cavaliers men's basketball coaches
Guards (basketball)